Quinisulcius capitatus is a plant pathogenic nematode infecting oats.

See also 
 List of oat diseases

References

External links 
 BioLib.cz

Tylenchida
Oats diseases
Agricultural pest nematodes